Gao Xuefeng (born March 22, 1980) is a Chinese speed skater who competed in the 2006 Winter Olympics in Turin.

References

External links 
 
 
 
 

1980 births
Living people
Chinese male speed skaters
Olympic speed skaters of China
Speed skaters at the 2006 Winter Olympics
Speed skaters at the 2010 Winter Olympics
Asian Games medalists in speed skating
Speed skaters at the 2003 Asian Winter Games
Speed skaters at the 2007 Asian Winter Games
Speed skaters at the 2011 Asian Winter Games
Asian Games silver medalists for China
Medalists at the 2007 Asian Winter Games
20th-century Chinese people
21st-century Chinese people